National Ligaen is the top American football league in Denmark founded in 1988. It is organized by the Danish American Football Federation. The league finale and the winning trophy is called Mermaid Bowl.
 
The Copenhagen Towers won the 2022 finale for a record tenth time, defeating the Gold Diggers 32–17.

Teams in 2022
 AaB 89ers
 Copenhagen Towers
 Søllerød Gold Diggers
 Triangle Razorbacks

Mermaid Bowl
The Mermaid Bowl is the DAFF championship game, the Danish equivalent of the NFL's Super Bowl. The name is taken from the famous Little Mermaid, a symbol of Denmark. The first final, in 1988, was not played under the Mermaid Bowl name.

References

American football in Denmark
American football leagues in Europe
1988 establishments in Denmark
Sports leagues established in 1988